Nandigam Suresh is an Indian politician. He was elected to the Lok Sabha, lower house of the Parliament of India from Bapatla, Andhra Pradesh in the 2019 Indian general election as a member of the YSR Congress Party.

Early life 

Mr. Suresh Nandigama was born in Uddandarayunipalem village in Guntur district of Andhra Pradesh state to a poor agriculture labour family which gave him exposure to problems being faced by farmers at a very young age. At the age of 15 he gave up on his education and moved to Vijayawada to work as a photographer to support his family financially.

References

External links
 Official biographical sketch in Parliament of India website

India MPs 2019–present
Lok Sabha members from Andhra Pradesh
Living people
1976 births
People from Guntur